The 1990 Washington State Cougars football team was an American football team that represented Washington State University in the Pacific-10 Conference (Pac-10) during the 1990 NCAA Division I-A football season. In their second season under head coach Mike Price, the Cougars compiled a 3–8 record (2–6 in Pac-10, ninth), and were outscored by their opponents 381 to 286.

The team's statistical leaders included Drew Bledsoe with 1,386 passing yards, Shaumbe Wright-Fair with 739 rushing yards, and Phillip Bobo with 758 receiving yards.

WSU played three quarterbacks this season: senior Brad Gossen, redshirt sophomore Aaron Garcia, and true freshman Bledsoe, who started the final five games. The Cougars played their home games on campus at Martin Stadium in Pullman; sand-filled Omniturf was installed prior to the season, and the offset double-support goal posts made their debut.

For the only time since 1935, Northwest foe Oregon was not on the Cougars' schedule (excluding the war years without a team (1943, 1944)).

Schedule

Source:

Roster

NFL Draft
For the first time in fourteen years, no Cougars were selected in the 1991 NFL Draft; four were taken the following year.

References

Washington State
Washington State Cougars football seasons
Washington State Cougars football